Lee Li-chun (born 2 May 1952) is a Taiwanese actor and xiangsheng performer.

Career 
In 2005, Lee took the lead role in Godot's My First Wives. Lee and Chin shared the stage for Godot's 2008 production Othello. The performance premiered in Kaohsiung on 30 August 2008, and traveled across the island, to Hsinchu, Tainan, and Taipei, to mark Godot's twentieth anniversary. Lee remained on the cast as the show's run stretched into January 2009. Later that year, Lee starred in Godot's adaption of Fools.

Selected filmography
Terrorizers (1986)
Secret Love for the Peach Blossom Spring (1992)
Love Is Payable (1997)
State of Divinity (2000 TV series) (2000)
Art (2003)
Othello (2008–2009)
Fools (2009)
The Qin Empire (TV series) (2009)
Young Sherlock (2014)
Goodbye Mr. Loser (2015)
The Sleuth of the Ming Dynasty (2020)

References

External links

1952 births
Living people
Taiwanese male comedians
Taiwanese male stage actors
Taiwanese male television actors
Taiwanese male film actors
20th-century Taiwanese male actors
21st-century Taiwanese male actors
Taiwanese xiangsheng performers